Andrew Stephen Dawson (born 8 December 1979) is an English former professional footballer who played as a defender or a midfielder in the Football League for York City, in non-League football for Scarborough, and was on the books of Carlisle United without making a league appearance.

References

External links

1979 births
Living people
Footballers from York
English footballers
Association football defenders
Association football midfielders
York City F.C. players
Carlisle United F.C. players
Scarborough F.C. players
English Football League players
National League (English football) players